Josip Barišić may refer to:

 Josip Barišić (footballer, born 1981), Croatian footballer
 Josip Barišić (footballer, born 1983), Bosnian footballer
 Josip Barišić (footballer, born 1986), Croatian footballer